Visakhapatnam West Assembly constituency is a constituency in Visakhapatnam district of Andhra Pradesh. It is one of the seven assembly segments of Visakhapatnam (Lok Sabha constituency), along with Bheemili, Visakhapatnam East, Visakhapatnam South, Visakhapatnam North and Gajuwaka. Gana Venkata Reddy Naidu Pethakamsetti (Gana Babu) is the present MLA of the constituency, who won the 2019 Andhra Pradesh Legislative Assembly election from Telugu Desam Party. , there are a total of 236,310 electors in the constituency.

Mandals 
The mandal and wards that form the assembly constituency are:

Members of Legislative Assembly

Election results

Assembly elections 2019

Assembly elections 2014

Assembly Elections 2009

See also 
 List of constituencies of the Andhra Pradesh Legislative Assembly

References 

Assembly constituencies of Andhra Pradesh